Ammophila is the type genus of the subfamily Ammophilinae of the hunting wasp family Sphecidae. Ammophila is a large and cosmopolitan genus, with over 200 species, mostly occurring in the warmer regions of all continents apart from Antarctica.

Vernacular names

They sometimes are referred to as "thread-waisted wasps", but the name is not definitive, because many other members of the Sphecidae are thread-waisted, too, and referred to as such. Sometimes Ammophiline wasps are referred to as "sand wasps"; this may be better because it is consistent with the name Ammophila, which derives from the Greek for "sand lover", presumably because many species dig their nests in sand. However, as is frequent in dealing with common names, no definitive common name for the Ammophilinae exists; entomologists usually confine themselves to the technical names for convenience and clarity.

Morphology and habits
As is frequent in large genera, considerable variation occurs in their habits and appearance, but predominantly they are medium-sized wasps of strikingly slender build, with antennae about as long as the head plus thorax.

The jaws are not large, but are strong and apart from feeding and digging, often are used for unexpected functions such as holding a pebble with which the wasp hammers down soil to seal a nest, or to grip the stem of a plant at night, holding its body at right-angles to the stem, its legs folded and all the weight taken up by the mandibles. This habit is not unique to the Ammophilinae — some bees, such as Amegilla, also overnight in that way, and Fabre documented some others.

Nesting
Nesting is generally by digging an unbranched tunnel in sandy soil, but provisioning can be progressive, the mother bringing prey as the larva requires it, or mass provisioning, where each nest is provided with a single large prey item, or as many small prey items as should be required. Prey selection depends on the species available but mostly moth and sawfly caterpillars are chosen.

Species

The genus Ammophila was created by the English parson-naturalist William Kirby in 1798. It contains 243 extant species:

Ammophila aberti Haldeman, 1852
Ammophila abnormis Dollfuss, 2013
Ammophila acuta (Fernald, 1934) 
Ammophila adelpha Kohl, 1901 
Ammophila aellos Menke, 1966
Ammophila afghanica Balthasar, 1957
Ammophila africana Dollfuss, 2015
Ammophila albotomentosa Morice, 1900 
Ammophila altigena Gussakovskij, 1930
Ammophila antenniferruginea Yan and Q. Li, 2010
Ammophila antoninae Danilov, 2018
Ammophila antropovi Dollfuss, 2013
Ammophila aphrodite Menke, 1964
Ammophila apicalis Guérin-Méneville, 1835
Ammophila arabica W.F. Kirby, 1900
Ammophila ardens F. Smith, 1868
Ammophila areolata Walker, 1871
Ammophila argyrocephala Arnold, 1951
Ammophila arnoldi Dollfuss, 2015
Ammophila arvensis Lepeletier de Saint Fargeau, 1845
Ammophila asiatica Tsuneki, 1971
Ammophila assimilis Kohl, 1901
Ammophila atripes F. Smith, 1852
Ammophila aucella Menke, 1966
Ammophila aurifera R. Turner, 1908
Ammophila azteca Cameron, 1888
Ammophila barbara (Lepeletier de Saint Fargeau, 1845)
Ammophila barbarorum Arnold, 1951
Ammophila barkalovi Danilov, 2015
Ammophila beaumonti Dollfuss, 2013
Ammophila bechuana (R. Turner, 1929)
Ammophila bella Menke, 1966
Ammophila bellula Menke, 1964
Ammophila beniniensis (Palisot de Beauvois, 1806)
Ammophila bispinosa Dollfuss, 2015
Ammophila boharti Menke, 1964
Ammophila borealis Q. Li and C. Yang, 1990
Ammophila braunsi (R. Turner, 1919)
Ammophila breviceps F. Smith, 1856
Ammophila brevipennis Bingham, 1897
Ammophila californica Menke, 1964
Ammophila calva (Arnold, 1920)
Ammophila campestris Latreille, 1809
Ammophila caprella Arnold, 1951
Ammophila cellularis Gussakovskij, 1930
Ammophila centralis Cameron, 1888
Ammophila centroafricana Dollfuss, 2015
Ammophila clavus (Fabricius, 1775)
Ammophila cleopatra Menke, 1964
Ammophila clypeola Q. Li and C. Yang, 1990
Ammophila clypeolineata Dollfuss, 2015
Ammophila coachella Menke, 1966
Ammophila conditor F. Smith, 1856
Ammophila confusa A. Costa, 1864
Ammophila conifera (Arnold, 1920)
Ammophila cora Cameron, 1888
Ammophila coronata A. Costa, 1864
Ammophila crassifemoralis (R. Turner, 1919)
Ammophila cybele Menke, 1970
Ammophila dantoni Roth in Nadig, 1933
Ammophila dejecta Cameron, 1888
Ammophila dentigera Gussakovskij, 1928
Ammophila deserticola Tsuneki, 1971
Ammophila djaouak de Beaumont, 1956
Ammophila dolichocephala Cameron, 1910
Ammophila dolichodera Kohl, 1884
Ammophila dubia Kohl, 1901
Ammophila duhokensis Augul, Abdoul-Rassoul, and Kaddou, 2013
Ammophila dysmica Menke, 1966
Ammophila electa Kohl, 1901
Ammophila elongata Fischer de Waldheim, 1843
Ammophila erminea Kohl, 1901
Ammophila evansi Menke, 1964
Ammophila exsecta Kohl, 1906
Ammophila extremitata Cresson, 1865
Ammophila eyrensis R. Turner, 1908
Ammophila femurrubra W. Fox, 1894
Ammophila fernaldi (Murray, 1938)
Ammophila ferruginosa Cresson, 1865
Ammophila filata Walker, 1871
Ammophila fischeri Dollfuss, 2015
Ammophila formicoides Menke, 1964
Ammophila formosensis Tsuneki, 1971
Ammophila ganquana Yang and Li, 1989
Ammophila gaumeri Cameron, 1888
Ammophila globifrontalis Q. Li and Ch. Yang, 1995
Ammophila globiverticalis Ch. Wang and L. Ma, 2018
Ammophila gracilis Lepeletier de Saint Fargeau, 1845
Ammophila gracillima Taschenberg, 1869
Ammophila guichardi de Beaumont, 1956
Ammophila gusenleitneri Dollfuss, 2013
Ammophila gussakovskii Dollfuss, 2013
Ammophila haimatosoma Kohl, 1884
Ammophila haladai Dollfuss, 2013
Ammophila hallelujah Menke, 2020
Ammophila harti (Fernald, 1931)
Ammophila hemilauta Kohl, 1906
Ammophila hermosa Menke, 1966
Ammophila heteroclypeola Li and Xue, 1998 
Ammophila hevans Menke, 2004
Ammophila heydeni Dahlbom, 1845
Ammophila holosericea (Fabricius, 1793)
Ammophila honorei Alfieri, 1946
Ammophila horni von Schulthess, 1927
Ammophila hungarica Mocsáry, 1883
Ammophila hurdi Menke, 1964
Ammophila iliensis Kazenas, 2001
Ammophila imitator Menke, 1966
Ammophila induta Kohl, 1901
Ammophila infesta F. Smith, 1873
Ammophila insignis F. Smith, 1856
Ammophila insolata F. Smith, 1858
Ammophila instabilis F. Smith, 1856
Ammophila juncea Cresson, 1865
Ammophila kalaharica (Arnold, 1935)
Ammophila karenae Menke, 1964
Ammophila kennedyi (Murray, 1938)
Ammophila kenyensis Dollfuss, 2015
Ammophila kondarensis Danilov, 2018
Ammophila kowalczyki Olszewski, 2020
Ammophila laeviceps F. Smith, 1873
Ammophila laevicollis Ed. André, 1886
Ammophila laevigata F. Smith, 1856
Ammophila laminituberalis Ch. Wang and Ma, 2018
Ammophila lampei Strand, 1910
Ammophila lativalvis Gussakovskij, 1928
Ammophila leclercqi Menke, 1964
Ammophila leoparda (Fernald, 1934)
Ammophila linda Menke, 2020
Ammophila longiclypeata Dollfuss, 2015
Ammophila macra Cresson, 1865
Ammophila malickyi Dollfuss, 2015
Ammophila marshi Menke, 1964
Ammophila mcclayi Menke, 1964
Ammophila mediata Cresson, 1865
Ammophila menghaiana Q. Li and C. Yang, 1989
Ammophila menkei Dollfuss, 2013
Ammophila meridionalis Kazenas, 1980
Ammophila mescalero Menke, 1966
Ammophila mexica Menke, 2020
Ammophila mimica Menke, 1966
Ammophila mitlaensis Alfieri, 1961
Ammophila modesta Mocsáry, 1883
Ammophila moenkopi Menke, 1967
Ammophila monachi Menke, 1966
Ammophila mongolensis Tsuneki, 1971
Ammophila murrayi Menke, 1964
Ammophila namibiensis Dollfuss, 2015
Ammophila nancy Menke, 2007
Ammophila nasalis Provancher, 1895
Ammophila nasuta Lepeletier de Saint Fargeau, 1845
Ammophila nearctica Kohl, 1889
Ammophila nefertiti Menke, 1964
Ammophila nemkovi Danilov, 2018
Ammophila nigri Dollfuss, 2015
Ammophila nigricans Dahlbom, 1843
Ammophila nigrifrons Dollfuss, 2015
Ammophila nigrina F. Morawitz, 1889
Ammophila nitida Fischer de Waldheim, 1834
Ammophila novita (Fernald, 1934)
Ammophila obliquestriolae Yang and Li, 1989
Ammophila occipitalis F. Morawitz, 1890
Ammophila ohli Dollfuss, 2013
Ammophila pachythoracalis Yang and Li, 1989
Ammophila pakistana Dollfuss, 2013
Ammophila parapolita (Fernald, 1934)
Ammophila parapunctaticeps Dollfuss, 2015
Ammophila parkeri Menke, 1964
Ammophila peckhami (Fernald, 1934)
Ammophila peringueyi (Arnold, 1928)
Ammophila persica Dollfuss, 2013
Ammophila pevtsovi Danilov, 2015
Ammophila picipes Cameron, 1888
Ammophila pictipennis Walsh, 1869
Ammophila pilimarginata Cameron, 1912
Ammophila placida F. Smith, 1856
Ammophila platensis Brèthes, 1909
Ammophila poecilocnemis Morice, 1900
Ammophila polita Cresson, 1865
Ammophila procera Dahlbom, 1843
Ammophila producticollis Morice, 1900
Ammophila proxima (F. Smith, 1856)
Ammophila pruinosa Cresson, 1865
Ammophila pseudodolichodera Dollfuss, 2015
Ammophila pseudoheydeni Li and He, 2000
Ammophila pseudokalaharica Dollfuss, 2015
Ammophila pseudonasuta Bytinski-Salz in de Beaumont and Bytinski-Salz, 1955
Ammophila pubescens Curtis, 1836
Ammophila pulawskii Tsuneki, 1971
Ammophila punctata F. Smith, 1856
Ammophila punctaticeps (Arnold, 1920)
Ammophila punti Guichard, 1988
Ammophila quadraticollis A. Costa, 1893
Ammophila rauschi Dollfuss, 2013
Ammophila regina Menke, 1964
Ammophila ressli Dollfuss, 2015
Ammophila roborovskyi Kohl, 1906
Ammophila rubigegen Q. Li and C. Yang, 1990
Ammophila rubiginosa Lepeletier de Saint Fargeau, 1845
Ammophila rubripes Spinola, 1839
Ammophila ruficosta Spinola, 1851
Ammophila rufipes Guérin-Méneville, 1831
Ammophila sabulosa (Linnaeus, 1758)
Ammophila saengeri Dollfuss, 2015
Ammophila sarekandana Balthasar, 1957
Ammophila sareptana Kohl, 1884
Ammophila saussurei (du Buysson, 1897)
Ammophila schalleri Dollfuss, 2015
Ammophila schmideggeri Dollfuss, 2013
Ammophila separanda F. Morawitz, 1891
Ammophila sickmanni Kohl, 1901
Ammophila sinensis Sickmann, 1894
Ammophila smithii F. Smith, 1856
Ammophila snizeki Dollfuss, 2015
Ammophila stangei Menke, 1964
Ammophila strenua Cresson, 1865
Ammophila striata Mocsáry, 1878
Ammophila strumosa Kohl, 1906
Ammophila subassimilis Strand, 1913
Ammophila tekkensis Gussakovskij, 1930
Ammophila terminata F. Smith, 1856
Ammophila theryi (Gribodo, 1894)
Ammophila touareg Ed. André, 1886
Ammophila tsunekii Menke in Bohart and Menke, 1976
Ammophila tuberculiscutis Turner, 1919
Ammophila turneri Dollfuss, 2015
Ammophila tyrannica Cameron, 1890
Ammophila unita Menke, 1966
Ammophila untumoris Yang and Li, 1989 
Ammophila urnaria Dahlbom, 1843
Ammophila vagabunda F. Smith, 1856
Ammophila varipes Cresson, 1865
Ammophila vetuberosa Q. Li and J. Yang, 1994
Ammophila vulcania du Buysson, 1897
Ammophila wahlbergi Dahlbom, 1845
Ammophila wrightii (Cresson, 1868)
Ammophila xinjiangana Q. Li and C. Yang, 1989
Ammophila yaroslavi Danilov, 2018
Ammophila zambiensis Dollfuss, 2015
Ammophila zanthoptera Cameron, 1888
Ammophila zapoteca Menke, 2020
Ammophila zetteli Dollfuss, 2015
Ammophila zimmermannae Dollfuss, 2013

References

External links 

Biological pest control wasps
Sphecidae
Articles containing video clips
Taxa named by William Kirby (entomologist)
Apoidea genera